The 13225 / 26 Jaynagar - Rajendra Nagar Terminal Intercity Express is an Express train belonging to Indian Railways Southern Railway zone that runs between  and  in India.

Coaches
The 13225 / 26 Jaynagar - Rajendra Nagar Terminal Intercity Express has one AC Chair Car, five general unreserved & two SLR (seating with luggage rake) coaches . It does not carry a pantry car coach.

As is customary with most train services in India, coach composition may be amended at the discretion of Indian Railways depending on demand.

Service

Routing

Traction
As the route is going to electrification, a  based WDM-3A diesel locomotive pulls the train to its destination.

References

External links
13225 Intercity Express at India Rail Info
13226 Intercity Express at India Rail Info

Intercity Express (Indian Railways) trains
Transport in Jainagar
Rail transport in Bihar
Transport in Patna